Olari is a commune in Prahova County, Muntenia, Romania. It is composed of three villages: Fânari, Olari, and Olarii Vechi. Until 2004, these belonged to Gherghița Commune, when they were split off to form a separate commune.

At the 2011 census, all but one of the commune's inhabitants for whom data were available identified as ethnic Romanian. 97.8% were Romanian Orthodox, 1.6% Adventist and 0.4% Christian Evangelical.

Natives
 Constantin Ticu Dumitrescu (1928–2008), politician

References

Communes in Prahova County
Localities in Muntenia